Orders, decorations and medals of Albania are state decorations regulated and bestowed by the Republic of Albania.

History
The first decoration to be given in modern Albania is considered to be the Order of the Black Eagle, which was granted by the Principality of Albania in 1913.

In 1925, Ahmet Zogu, while President of Albania, instituted the Order of Skanderbeg. In 1926, he established the Order of Fidelity, also known as the Order of Besa.

Several laws were passed during Communist Albania. In 1960, the law On the creation of the honorary titles in the arts sector was passed by the Presidium of the People's Assembly.

In 1980, another law, entitled On the honorary titles and decorations in the Socialist People's Republic of Albania, amended the 1960 law.

In 1996, the Parliament of Albania passed the law entitled On the decorations in the Republic of Albania. An addition to the 1996 law was made in 2001. A regulation on the awarding of the decorations was issued afterwards by President Alfred Moisiu.

1914—1939
 Order of the Black Eagle (discontinued after 1914; retained as a dynastic order by the House of Wied)
 Medal of the Black Eagle
 Medal for the Accession of Prince William of Wied
 Order of Skanderbeg (1925–45) (discontinued after 1945; retained as a dynastic order by the House of Zogu)
 Collier of Honour of Albania
 Medal of Remembrance of the Triumph of Legality
 Order of Fidelity (discontinued after 1939; retained as a dynastic order by the House of Zogu)
 Military Order and Medal of Bravery

Honors system (1945–1992)
Albanian orders and medals from the socialist period are poorly understood and seldom collected, even after three decades since the regime's collapse in 1992. While the awards of many other communist states flooded the market in the mid 1990s (most notably those of the Soviet Union, Bulgaria, and East Germany), Albanian medals continue to remain elusive for many. The manufacturing of Albanian awards has undergone several phases and seems to fall in line with Albania's shifting alliances during Enver Hoxha's regime.

The first decorations established by the new communist government were created on July 9, 1945: Hero of the People, Order of the Flag, Medal of Remembrance, Order of the Partisan Star, Order and Medal of Bravery.

These awards were established for services in the anti-Fascist and partisan campaigns of World War II against both the Italians and Germans and carried a great deal of prestige. 
Soon after, on October 13, 1945, three more orders and two additional medals were added: Order of Freedom, Order of Skanderbeg, Order and Medal of Labour, Medal of Liberation.

Between the end of 1945 and 1964, several other decorations were established, most notably the titles Hero of Socialist Labour and Mother Heroine, as well as a series of honorary titles for the arts and sciences. 
On January 18, 1965, the entire honors system was completely revised. In addition to establishing many new orders and medals, some pre-existing decorations were modified as well. The Order of the Red Star was expanded from one to three classes and a new medal was added. The Order for "Military Service" was converted from a breast star to a ribboned badge and expanded from one to three classes. The Order "For Patriotic Achievements" was added in three classes to the pre-existing medal. The Order "For the Defence of State Frontiers of the PRA/PSRA" was added to the pre-existing medal. The Order "For Maintenance of Public Security" was added to the pre-existing medal. The Order "For Civil Bravery" was added to the pre-existing medal, which was renamed from the Medal "For Bravery in Labor". 

The 1965 awards structure remained largely intact with several minor additions and modifications up through to the collapse of the communist government. Law No. 6133. passed on February 2, 1980 codified many of the regulations and changes that were enacted since the 1965 restructuring. The 1980 law continued in effect until it was finally revoked by president Sali Berisha when he signed Law No. 8113 on March 28, 1996, which completely swept away the communist era honors system.

Titles and Decorations of the President (1996-present)

Decorations
 "Honor of the Nation" Decoration (Dekorata "Nderi i Kombit" )
 National Flag Decoration (Dekorata e Flamurit Kombëtar)
 "Gjergj Kastrioti Skënderbeu" Decoration (Dekorata "Gjergj Kastrioti Skënderbeu")

 "Mother Teresa" Decoration (Dekorata "Nënë Tereza")
 Golden Decoration of the Eagle ("Dekorata e Artë e Shqiponjës")
 "Torch of Democracy" Decoration (Dekorata "Pishtar i Demokracisë")

Titles
 "Knight of Skanderbeg Order" Title (Titulli "Kalorës i Udhërit të Skënderbeut")
 "Knight of the Order of the Flag" Title (Titulli "Kalorës i urdhrit të flamurit")
 "Grand Master" Title (Titulli "Mjeshtër i Madh")
 "Naim Frashëri" Title (Titulli "Naim Frashëri")
 Military Services Medal (Medalja "Për Shërbime Ushtarake")
 Special Civil Merits Medal (Medalja "Për Merita të Veçanta Civile")
 Martyr of Democracy Medal (Medalja "Martir i Demokracisë")
 Medal of Gratitude ("Medalja e Mirënjohjes")

Medals of the Prime Minister (2019–present)

The "Public Acknowledgment" Medal

The medal consists of three classes and is awarded to prominent Albanian and foreign individuals with special contributions in the field of their activities:

 Big Cordon with a Star for Public Acknowledgment
 Great Star of Public Gratitude
 Star of Public Gratitude

The "Professional Assessment" Medal

The medal consists of three classes (Gold, Silver, Bronze) and is awarded to prominent individuals with contributions in their professional activities.

See also
 Sports titles system in Albania

References

Further reading

 President of Albania web page related to decorations.
 Decorations of communist Albania

 
Honours systems